HVDC Vancouver Island is a de-energized high-voltage direct current interconnection between Arnott Substation (ARN) in Delta, British Columbia at  on the Canadian mainland, and the Vancouver Island Terminal (VIT) in Duncan, British Columbia on Vancouver Island at . It went into operation in 1968 and was extended in 1977. HVDC Vancouver Island consists of three overhead line sections with a total length of 42 kilometres and two submarine cable sections with a length of 33 kilometres. Pole 1 ceased operation in 2014, and Pole 2 ceased operation in 2016. The infrastructure remains in place and portions may be re-used in the future.

Route

At , the first submarine cable section ends and a short overhead line section running south-west across Galiano Island starts.

A little to the west, on Parker Island at  the overhead line ends and the second submarine cable section begins.
At  the cable reaches Salt Spring Island and the third overhead line section starts. It crosses Salt Spring Island west-south-westerly. After this span the overhead line runs westward to Vancouver Island Terminal near the town of Duncan.

History
In 1968 the first pole of the HVDC Vancouver Island link went into service. Its static inverters use mercury vapour rectifiers. The maximum transmission capacity of this pole was 312 megawatts and the transmission voltage was 260 kV. The stations Vancouver Island Terminal and Arnott Substation were designed and delivered by Swedish company ASEA (later ABB). The Swedish team of some 10 people were headed for the first phase by Ivan Hedlund and for the second phase by Gunnar Ahgren.

In 1977 the HVDC Vancouver Island link was supplemented by installing a second pole. This pole used thyristor valves for its static inverters and operated at a voltage of 280 kV with a rating of 370 megawatts. A new 230 kV. submarine cable for three-phase alternating current has been constructed between the Canadian mainland and Vancouver Island. This parallels the existing two HVDC lines and replaces one of two earlier 138 kV lines. In the 2005 hearings for the new 230kV circuit the HVDC systems were reported to be at the end of their service life and are not considered to be reliable. As a result of this, the first pole was shut down in 2014 and the second in 2016.

Electrodes and metallic return
HVDC Vancouver Island used metallic return, during monopolar operation, when current is lower than 600 A. Otherwise earth return was used. On Vancouver Island the line for metallic return is a monopolar line on wooden poles, which are used in some sections also by AC lines, running parallel to the main line of HVDC Vancouver Island.

After this point it runs on wooden poles together with a single-circuit three-phase AC line until .

It is connected with Arnott Substation by an overhead pole line with two conductors. It is connected with Vancouver Island Terminal by an overhead line with two conductors, which is installed on wooden poles. It runs between Vancouver Island Terminal and a point northwest of Maple Bay at  parallel to other power lines.

See also
 Jordan River Dam
 Juan de Fuca Cable Project
 List of HVDC Projects
 Power lines connecting Vancouver Island with Canadian Mainland

External links
 http://www.bctransco.com/regulatory/applications/Vancouver+Island+Transmission+Reinforcement+Project+CPCN+Application.htm 
 https://www.bcuc.com/Documents/Proceedings/2005/DOC_7818_B1-1%20(Part%201%20of%202)%20VITR%20CPCN%20Application%20and%20Appx%20A-D.pdf
 https://web.archive.org/web/20051115122606/http://www.transmission.bpa.gov/cigresc14/Compendium/VANCOU.htm
 https://web.archive.org/web/20051115122606/http://www.transmission.bpa.gov/cigresc14/Compendium/Vancou+Pictures.pdf
 https://www.openstreetmap.org/relation/6026488#map=10/48.9396/-123.2391
 https://www.bchydro.com/content/dam/BCHydro/customer-portal/documents/corporate/suppliers/transmission-system/system_operating_orders/7T23.pdf

Vancouver Island
HVDC transmission lines
Electric power transmission systems in Canada
BC Hydro
Vancouver Island
1968 establishments in British Columbia
Energy infrastructure completed in 1968